Deinobacterium is a genus in the Deinococcota phylum (Bacteria). Not to be confused with Deinobacter, a disused name for Deinococcus.

Etymology
The name Deinobacterium derives from:
Greek adjective deinos (δεινός), dreadful, strange; New Latin neuter gender noun bacterium, nominally meaning "a rod", but in effect meaning a bacterium; New Latin masculine gender noun Deinobacterium, strange bacterium.

Species
The genus contains a single species, namely D. chartae ( Ekman et al. 2011,  (Type species of the genus).; Latin genitive case noun chartae, of/from paper.)
This bacterium is:
 rod-shaped
 non-spore-forming
 non-motile, aerobic
 oxidase and catalase-positive
 radiation-resistant bacterium
 pale pink colonies on oligotrophic medium at 12 to 50 °C (optimum 37 to 45 °C) and at pH 6 to 10.3
 peptidoglycan type A3β with L-Orn–Gly–Gly
 quinone: MK-8
 CG 67%
 isolated from biofilm collected from a Finnish paper mill

See also
 Bacterial taxonomy
 Microbiology
 List of bacterial orders
 List of bacteria genera

References 

Bacteria genera
Monotypic bacteria genera